"You're Beginning to Get to Me" is a song written by Tom Shapiro and Aaron Barker, and recorded by American country music singer Clay Walker.  It was released in August 1998 as the second and final single from his Greatest Hits compilation album.  It peaked at #2 on the Billboard Hot Country Singles & Tracks (now Hot Country Songs) chart.

Critical reception
Tara Seetharam of Country Universe listed "You're Beginning to Get to Me" as the 302nd best country single of the 1990s and wrote, "In his catalogue of fabulous 90s hits, this understated “love” song gets overshadowed by some of the more distinct ones, but it’s nonetheless memorable."

Chart performance
The song debuted at number 63 on the Hot Country Singles & Tracks chart dated August 22, 1998. It charted for 27 weeks on that chart, and peaked at number 2 on the chart dated January 2, 1999 (having been blocked from Number One by Terri Clark's "You're Easy on the Eyes", another song co-written by Tom Shapiro.) In addition, it entered the Top 40 on the Billboard Hot 100, where it peaked at number 39 on that chart.

Charts

Year-end charts

References

1998 singles
Clay Walker songs
Songs written by Tom Shapiro
Song recordings produced by James Stroud
Giant Records (Warner) singles
Songs written by Aaron Barker
1998 songs